The International Trade Union Committee of Negro Workers (ITUCNW) was a section of the Profintern active during the late 1920s and 1930s that acted as a radical transnational platform for black workers in Africa and the Atlantic World.

History 
It was launched in July 1930 at an "International Conference of Negro Workers" that took place in Hamburg. There were 17 delegates including:
Vivian Henry: Trinidad,
S. M. DeLeon: Jamaica,
I. T. A. Wallace-Johnson: Sierra Leone
Albert Nzula: South Africa
Jomo Kenyatta: Kenya
 Frank Macaulay
George Padmore
James W. Ford
 I. Hawkins
 J. Reid
 Edward Francis Small: Gambia

It produced a journal, The Negro Worker, which was edited by George Padmore until 1931 and by James W. Ford until 1937 when it ceased publication.

References

Footnotes

Sources

Ethnic organizations